Vitzthum is a surname. Notable people with the surname include:

Franz Vitzthum, German countertenor
Michael Vitzthum (born 1992), German footballer
Simon Vitzthum (born 1995), Swiss cyclist
Virginia Vitzthum, American anthropologist
Karl M. Vitzthum (1880–1967), American architect